The Women's under-23 individual pursuit at the European Track Championships was first competed in 1996 (according to cyclingarchives.com).

Medalists

References

under-23 individual pursuit
Women's individual pursuit